The 1986 Soviet Top League season was the 17th in Top League and 49th of its kind (between clubs). Dynamo Kyiv were the defending 11-times champions. 

A total of sixteen teams participated in the league, which was two teams fewer than in the 1985 season and no teams were promoted from the First League due to the league reorganization. Also it was the only season when the Top League contained more Ukrainian clubs rather than Russian 5 to 4. The overdraw concept was preserved with no more than 10 draws being allowed (same as the previous season). Dynamo Kyiv, however, was excused from the rule because the Soviet national football team, consisting almost exclusively out of the first team of Dynamo Kyiv, participated at the 1986 FIFA World Cup. The reduction of the league was compensated by the introduction of a new competition, the Cup of Football Federation of USSR. For that purpose the league took a short break in September when the new competition kicked off and involved only the participants of the Soviet Top League. The new competition was brief, lasting for just over a month.

The season began on March 1 and lasted until November 22, 1986, however some additional postponed games were played until December 7. The season was won by Dynamo Kyiv once again for the 12th time on the last day of the season on December 7 when they faced off against their main opponent Dynamo Moscow in Kiev, pulling off a dramatic 2–1 win and thus passing their Moscow rivals in the final league standings.

The top five clubs of the league later entered European competitions, joined additionally by the losing cup finalist Dinamo Minsk, beaten by Dynamo Kyiv in the 1987 Final. The winner of the 1986 League Cup Dnipro Dnipropetrovsk did not qualify for any European tournaments.

Teams

Promoted teams
 none

Location

League standings

Next year promotion
 CSKA Moscow
 Guria Lanchkhuti

Results

Top scorers
21 goals
 Aleksandr Borodyuk (Dynamo Moscow)

17 goals
 Oleh Protasov (Dnipro)
 Sergey Rodionov (Spartak Moscow)

13 goals
 Mashalla Akhmedov (Neftchi)
 Georgi Kondratyev (Dinamo Minsk)

12 goals
 Alexei Mikhailichenko (Dynamo Kyiv)
 Ihor Petrov (Shakhtar)
 Yuri Savichev (Torpedo Moscow)

10 goals
 Ihor Belanov (Dynamo Kyiv)
 Revaz Chelebadze (Dynamo Tbilisi)
 Arminas Narbekovas (Žalgiris)
 Yevstafi Pekhlevanidi (Kairat)

Medal squads
(league appearances and goals listed in brackets)

Number of teams by union republic

External links
 1986 Calendar for the Soviet Football competitions
 1986 season. RSSSF

Soviet Top League seasons
1
Soviet
Soviet